Árpád Borsányi (12 May 1932 – 31 December 1980) was a Hungarian weightlifter. He competed in the men's bantamweight event at the 1960 Summer Olympics.

References

1932 births
1980 deaths
Hungarian male weightlifters
Olympic weightlifters of Hungary
Weightlifters at the 1960 Summer Olympics
Sportspeople from Budapest